SFDS may refer to:

 San Francisco Day School
 Shanghai Film Dubbing Studio